Olepa ricini is a moth of the family Erebidae first described by Johan Christian Fabricius in 1775. It is found in Bangladesh, India, Nepal, and Sri Lanka. An older treatment placed the species in the genus Pericallia.

Description
It closely resembles the much less distributed Olepa ocellifera, and differs only in the lack of a chain like series of small yellow banded black spots in between large spots in forewings, which are present in O. ocellifera.

In The Fauna of British India, Including Ceylon and Burma: Moths Volume II, Hampson discussed both species as follows:

It is a minor pest, as a caterpillar, on cotton, castor, sunflower, gingelly, maize, ivy gourd, brinjal, sweetpotato, banana and Cucurbita crops.

References

Spilosomina
Moths described in 1775
Taxa named by Johan Christian Fabricius